Chirivel is a municipality of Almería province, in the autonomous community of Andalusia, Spain.

References

External links
  Chirivel - Sistema de Información Multiterritorial de Andalucía
  Chirivel - Diputación Provincial de Almería
  Portal of businesses and Information in Chirivel - TODOVELEZ.ES

Municipalities in the Province of Almería